Mose Humphrey was a member of Fire Company 40 in New York City in the 19th century, and the inspiration for the folk hero character "Mose the Fireboy".

The character of Mose first appeared on Broadway in Benjamin A. Baker's A Glance at New York, in 1848. Mose was featured in several stage shows and penny novels in the mid-19th century. The character was most identified with actor Frank Chanfrau.

Certain stories recall Mose performing extraordinary deeds, such as swimming the Hudson River with two strokes, or tearing up mulberry and cherry trees to use as a bludgeon against the Plug Uglies, a gang that were at odds with New York Firemen Co. 49.

The real Mose was a parishioner of St. Andrew's Church.

Notes

Further reading
 

New York City firefighters
History of New York City
History of firefighting
American folklore
Tall tales
19th-century American people
American legends